Luigi's Ladies is a 1989 Australian comedy directed by actor Judy Morris. It was the final film of actor David Rappaport.

References

External links
Luigi's Ladies at IMDb
Luigi's Ladies at Oz Movies

Australian comedy films
1980s English-language films
1980s Australian films